The Secret Book of Gnomes is a series of books about gnomes designed for children. They contain fictional stories and guides about how gnomes live in harmony with their environment, such as what a gnome has in his first aid kit and how a gnome's house is built. The books were written by the Dutch author Wil Huygen and illustrator Rien Poortvliet, though they have claimed that parts were written by a gnome called David. Those authors also created another series about gnomes entitled The Gnomes. 
That later was used as a basis for the television shows David the Gnome and Wisdom of the Gnomes by BRB Internacional.

References

Dutch children's books
Dutch picture books
Fantasy books by series
Dutch fantasy
Fictional gnomes
Children's books adapted into television shows